Skippy is a window management tool for X11 similar to Mac OS X's Exposé feature. It is a fullscreen task switcher that allows a user to quickly see open windows by two different sets of criteria, or to hide all windows and show the desktop without the need to click through many windows to find a specific target. Skippy-XD is a branch that provides 'live' (and updating) snapshots of the windows.

Usage 
Skippy (and Skippy-XD) usually needs to be compiled and installed from source, although binaries exist for some platforms (e.g., Ubuntu). After it is launched, the default hotkey for activating it is F11. The user can next choose a window with either the keyboard (by using the up, down, left and right keys) or the mouse and activate it by pressing the left mouse button or the return or spacebar key.

There are also two or three modifiers you can use with the hotkey: hold Control and Skippy (not used in Skippy-XD) will update the snapshots of all the windows. Hold Mod1 (aka the alt key) and skippy will only show the windows of the currently focused window's window group (like, all of gimp's windows, or all of kopete's windows), and if Skippy or Skippy-XD is compiled with Xinerama support and you have several heads, hold shift while pressing the hotkey to make it show the windows on all heads.

Clones
Projects with similar features are Komposé (an Exposé clone for KDE3) and Compiz, the latter containing built-in Exposé-style functionality which can be activated by pressing F12.

See also

 Dashboard (Mac OS)
 Taskbar
 Konfabulator
 Zooming User Interface

External links
Skippy Home Page (Currently down, as of Feb 2013.)

Skippy on KDE-Look.org
 - A slightly modified version of Skippy-XD
Skippy-XD PPA for Ubuntu - Repository providing Ubuntu binaries of Skippy-XD

Linux windowing system-related software